Palanganatham is a region in the city of Madurai.
It is in the southern part of Madurai on the way from Periyar to Tiruparankundram.
Its postal zip code is 625003. In earlier (before Mattuthavani Bus Stand operation), it was the main bus stand to go for south Tamil Nadu and Kerala. It is also called as Pazhanganatham .

Neighbourhoods and suburbs of Madurai